Tats Cru, Inc. is a group of Bronx-based graffiti artists turned professional muralists. The current members of Tats Cru are Bio, BG183, Nicer, HOW, and NOSM. Tats Cru were founded by Brim, Bio, BG183 and Nicer.

Over the last two decades, Tats Cru has produced various advertisements for clients ranging from neighborhood businesses and institutions to large corporations like Coca-Cola and Sony.

Tats Cru is also a major producer of New York City-style memorial murals, and have created artwork for many musicians including Nicki Minaj, Missy Elliott, Metallica, Big Pun, Jennifer Lopez, Rick Ross, DJ Kool Herc, Nas and many more.

Tats Cru has a strong bond with rapper Fat Joe and created many of his advertisement billboards for album releases in the 1990s.

Tats Cru heavily paints murals of friend and deceased rapper Big Pun and are solely responsible for the Big Pun memorial wall in the Bronx, New York City.

Artists

Bio
Wilfredo "Bio" Feliciano born April 20, 1966 in New York started his artistic career in the early eighties at the height of the New York City subway graffiti movement. Thirty years later he is considered to be one of the top stylists or letter masters throughout the movement worldwide. Known for his many letter styles, complex and intricate wild styles as well as his explosive use of colors. Bio is known as a true master of New York style painting.

Wilfredo "Bio" Feliciano is also a founding member of the world-famous art collective known as Tats Cru "The Mural Kings" originally known as TAT Cru founded by Brim, Mack and Bio in the eighties. Tats Cru continues to be a major force in the advancement of graffiti art both commercially and artistically. Tats Cru’s current active members are Hector "Nicer" Nazario, Sotero "Bg183" Ortiz, Raoul "How" Perre, Davide "Nosm" Perre and Totem2.

Wilfredo "Bio" Feliciano’s work has been featured in many publications, movies, music videos and documentaries throughout his career. He has also painted in numerous countries over the past 30 years, invited by different organizations. Bio has collaborated with many of the top graffiti artists in the world from past to present day. He has also lectured at M.I.T. and various universities in the United States. Bio was also part of the Smithsonian Institution’s 35th annual Folklife Festival in Washington D.C. where Tats Cru was chosen to represent New York City muralists at the festival.

Wilfredo "Bio" Feliciano continues to work and live in New York City.

Nicer
He was born Hector Nazario in the South Bronx in 1967. He was fortunate enough to be born with creativity running through his veins at an early age. Throughout the 1970s he played in abandoned buildings, transforming them in his mind into magical worlds of wonder and using his surroundings to create trucks and cars of bricks and wood chunks found in abandoned lots in his South Bronx neighborhood.

In the 1980s, as a teenager he was drawn to the colored written graffiti on the New York City Subway trains and walls. He went on to become one of the founding members of The Famous "TAT Crew". It was his first official introduction to the art world.

At the end off the subway painting movement that propelled the TAT crew into subculture stardom, the members split and went their own ways, except for three. NICER and his two childhood painting partners vowed to continue to do what they’d loved, painting.

Forming the firstgGraffiti company of its kind, "Tats Cru, Inc" was born.  It was 1996 and Tats Cru had one main goal; to show the world that graffiti is a viable art form.

In the three decades that Nicer has been painting, he has created artwork for many well-known clients like:

HOW and NOSM
Twin brothers Raoul and David Perre, respectively known as HOW and NOSM, are graffiti artists and professional muralists residing in New York. Born in the Basque country of San Sebastian, Spain, the Perre brothers were raised in Düsseldorf, Germany practicing the Bronx-born art form of graffiti. Their late teenage years were spent spraypainting around the world, visiting more than 60 countries and leaving their remarkably detail oriented artwork on everything from buildings to subway trains. During a visit to New York in 1997, HOW and NOSM were asked to become members of Tats Cru. Shortly thereafter in 1999, they permanently relocated to New York, a move that influenced their transition from tagging and spray painting trains to creating refined large scale murals and paintings on canvas. HOW and NOSM have been featured in several publications, including The New York Times, The New Yorker and LA Weekly. Their artwork has stirred the likes of Reverend Al Sharpton with its controversial undertones of radical subjects manifested within their art. As adept with a spray can as only few artists could ever hope to be with a brush, the Perres’ body of work includes everything from canvases and large-scale multimedia sculpture to practically anything they feel compelled to leave their signature on.

While stylized and technical work is often compromised by the use of vibrant colors and flashy effects, How and Nosm have taken an opposite approach. In their most recent work, the brothers have restricted themselves to a sparse color palette of red, black and white. This limitation of color accentuates every line, creating a framework that jumps to the forefront. The drawings maintain the aesthetic of Jacks, Queens and Kings pulled from a deck of playing cards. The meticulous lines and intricate patterns presented in such a minimalist fashion make How and Nosm’s work instantly recognizable and unique.

Totem

Graffiti artist Mister Totem has applied paint to walls for 20 years.

Totem’s well-known style and technique is renowned worldwide, most noted for his signature robotic armored letters, characters, and wild versatility. His strongest points are backgrounds and creating a very complete final mural, not just the average piece by piece graffiti normally seen.

Starting in Atlanta, Georgia as his home he has traveled and painted across the globe. Spraying countries such as Japan, the Philippines, New Zealand, Germany, Switzerland, Greece, France, and the United Kingdom. His work showcased in galleries from New York and Los Angeles to Japan. His work has also been commissioned by many corporate companies looking to borrow street credibility from his art.

References

External links 
 
 TATS Cru Interview

American graffiti artists
Artists from the Bronx